Kiln Wood is a   nature reserve south of Lenham in Kent. It is managed by Kent Wildlife Trust.

This wood is mainly oak, hornbeam and hazel, and it is managed by coppicing. A stream at the northern end has lady fern, herb paris and broad buckler-fern.

There is access from Headcorn Road.

References

Kent Wildlife Trust